Gabor Kasa (born 3 February 1989 in Subotica) is a Serbian former road bicycle racer. He competed at the 2012 Summer Olympics in the men's road race.

Major results

2007
 1st  Time trial, National Junior Road Championships
2008
 2nd GP Betonexpressz 2000
 4th Tour of Vojvodina II
2009
 7th Overall Grand Prix Guillaume Tell
 10th Overall Coupe des nations Ville Saguenay
2011
 1st Overall Tour of Alanya
1st Stage 3
 4th Overall Tour de Serbie
1st Stage 2
 4th Tour of Vojvodina II
 6th Overall Tour of Victory
1st Prologue
 6th Tour of Vojvodina I
 9th Poreč Trophy
 10th Overall Tour of Trakya
1st Stage 2
2012
 1st Stage 4 Sibiu Cycling Tour
 8th Overall Tour of Trakya
2013
 2nd Time trial, National Road Championships
 9th Overall Tour de Serbie
 9th Central European Tour Miskolc GP
2014
 1st  Time trial, National Road Championships
 10th Overall Tour of Al Zubarah
 10th Grand Prix Sarajevo
2015
 National Road Championships
1st  Time trial
3rd Road race
 9th Grand Prix Sarajevo

References

External links
 
 

Serbian male cyclists
1989 births
Living people
Olympic cyclists of Serbia
Cyclists at the 2012 Summer Olympics
European Games competitors for Serbia
Sportspeople from Subotica
Cyclists at the 2015 European Games
21st-century Serbian people